Lacconectus simoni, is a species of predaceous diving beetle found in India and Sri Lanka.

It can be identified by congeners due to having large yellow extension on elytra.

References 

Dytiscidae
Insects of Sri Lanka
Insects described in 1893